The Church of Our lady of Muxima (in Portuguese, Igreja da Nossa Senhora da Conceição da Muxima) is located in the Muxima District of Bengo Province, western Angola.   

The 16th century Portuguese Colonial style church was an important center in the Portuguese slave trade in Angola.

History 
The church stands on the left bank of the Kwanza River, and is a contemporary of the Fortress of C`Muxima' 7. The village of Muxirna was occupied by the Portuguese in 1589 and ten years later (1599), the Fortress was founded and the church was built with a prayer invoking divine blessing from "Nossa Senhora da Muxirna".

Muxima was an important empire of slave traffic, protected by the Fortress, and the church played an important role in the materialization of the traffic, because it was in this religious local, where the slaves were baptized before being deported.

Architecture
It is spacious and strong building, with a stern, typically Portuguese architecture, built above the Kwanza River. It was set on fire by the colonial Dutch in 1641, when they captured Muxima. Later, it was modified. 

The sanctuary, with a Virgin image, has been a place of great devotion for Christian pilgrims for generations. 

It was classified as National Monument by Portuguese Provincial Decree No. 2, on 12  January 1924. It is relatively in good order and belongs to the Roman Catholic Church. The responsibility for its maintenance and preservation concerns the Ministry of Culture.

World Heritage Status 
This site was added to the UNESCO World Heritage Tentative List on November 22, 1996, in the Cultural category.

See also
Portuguese colonisation of Africa

Notes

References 
Valdez, F. T. (1861), Six Years of a Traveller's Life in Western Africa, Vol. II, Hurst and Blackett.
Church of Nossa Senhora da Conceiçào da Muxima - UNESCO World Heritage Centre

Bengo Province
Portuguese Angola
Roman Catholic churches in Angola
16th century in Angola
World Heritage Tentative List